Christian Vander (born 21 February 1948) is a French drummer, musician, and founder of the band Magma.

Career
Vander is known for his extended compositions, drumming, and shrill falsetto improvisational/scat singing. His music fuses jazz, rock, classical and operatic influences, and draws on the work of musicians as diverse as John Coltrane and Carl Orff.

Family 
Christian Vander is the adopted child of famous French jazz piano player Maurice Vander (who was a long time sideman of the French singer Claude Nougaro). Most of Vander and Magma's recorded work is still available through Vander's own record label, Seventh Records.

He was married to singer Stella Vander who released many EPs herself in the 1960s and has performed vocal duties for Magma since 1972. They divorced in the 1980s, with speculations that this occurred in the hiatus years. Christian and Stella have a daughter, Julie, who has appeared on several Magma and Offering releases.

See also
Romantic Warriors II: A Progressive Music Saga About Rock in Opposition
Romantic Warriors II: Special Features DVD

References

External links

1948 births
Bandleaders
Constructed language creators
French adoptees
French jazz drummers
French classical musicians
French male classical composers
French musicians
French songwriters
Jazz-rock percussionists
Living people
People from Nogent-sur-Marne
Male drummers
Male songwriters
Magma (band) members
Progressive rock drummers